The SME Ordnance Sdn Bhd (SMEO), formerly known as Syarikat Malaysia Explosive Sdn Bhd, is a Malaysian defence company that specialises in the manufacturing and marketing of ordnance. The company is located in Batu Arang, Selangor.

SMEO is a subsidiary company of National Aerospace and Defence Industries Sdn Bhd.

History

SME Ordance was formed in 1969 as a joint venture company with equity participation between the Government of Malaysia, Dynamit Nobel of Germany, Oerlikon Machine Tools of Switzerland and two local partners namely Syarikat Permodalan Kebangsaan and Syarikat Jaya Raya Sdn Bhd. The Malaysian government later acquired all shares in 1974, making SMEO a government-owned company. In 1991, SMEO acquired a licence to manufacture Steyr AUG rifles. Joint production with Steyr to produce the AUG A1/A3 models later started in 2003 and 2004. SMEO later withdrew from joint production.

On 28 September 1993, SMEO was approved by Royal Ordnance Division, British Aerospace (BAe) as the preferred suppliers of weapons and ammunition. The Standards and Industrial Research Institute of Malaysia (SIRIM) bestowed and registered SMEO's quality system as compliant with MS ISO 9002:1991 systems on 7 December 1993. On 21 February 2001, SMEO integrated Syarikat Malaysia Explosive Technologies Sdn Bhd.

SMEO acquired the licence to manufacture M4 carbines in 2006–2007 with Colt Defence, as announced by Datuk Seri Najib Tun Razak after he gave SMEO a letter of intent to procure 14,000 rifles to replace the Steyr AUG. In 2009, SMEO announced that they would invest RM36.4 million for further research and development into the M4 carbine. The amount consists of RM26.4 million, which will be for the purchase of machinery and RM10 million for the buildings. 14,000 M4s will be supplied to the Malaysian army. Under the ASEAN Defence Industry Collaboration programme, Malaysia plans to produce the M4 carbine together with Indonesia and Thailand and market the weapon to ASEAN countries that want to purchase it.

Products and services

Source :

Rifles
Steyr AUG 
M4 carbine

Small arms ammunition
Cal. 0.38 Special (Lead Round Nose)
Cal. 9 x 19 mm Ball (Luger/Parabellum)
Cal. 5.56 x 45 mm Ball M193 (Loose/Link)
Cal. 5.56 x 45 mm Steel Core M855/SS109
Cal. 5.56 x 45 mm Tracer M196
Cal. 5.56 x 45 mm Blank M200
Cal. 5.56 x 46 mm Blank Long Nose
Cal. 7.62 x 51 mm Ball Nato
Cal. 7.62 x 51 mm 4B1T
Cal. 12.7 mm (All Natures)
Cal. 20 mm Oerlikon (All Natures)
Cal. 25 mm Bushmaster (All Natures)
Cal. 30 mm ADEN (All Natures)
Cal. 35 mm Oerlikon (All Natures)

Large calibre ammunition
Rounds 57 mm L70 AA ammunition
60 mm and 81 mm mortar bombs
Rounds 90 mm HE-T/HESH-T
105 mm artillery ammunition
155 mm artillery ammunition
84 mm Carl-Gustav ammunition
Rounds 105 mm HE
Aircraft bombs
Aircraft rockets
Sea and land mines
Starburst practice missile refurbishment
Cast booster
Demolition charge (1 lb, 10 lb and 25 lb)

Pyrotechnics products
Coloured smoke grenades
76 mm smoke grenades IR
Mini flares
Wire tripflares
Hand held rockets
Day and night signal distress
Ground illuminating flares
Aviation smoke generator
Signal cartridge 26.5 & 38 mm
Thunderflash
Cart.C.S anti-riot 38 mm
Hand thrown C.S anti-riot
High explosives hand grenade
Detonating cord
Electric and non electric detonator
Safety fuzes

See also

 SME Aerospace - Sister company

References

External links
 

Firearm manufacturers of Malaysia
Defense companies of Malaysia
Companies based in Kuala Lumpur
Manufacturing companies established in 1969
1969 establishments in Malaysia
Privately held companies of Malaysia
Malaysian brands